The little Indian field mouse (Mus booduga) is a species of rodent in the family Muridae. It is found in Bangladesh, India, Myanmar, Nepal, and Sri Lanka.

Description
Head and body length is 7 cm. Tail is 6 cm. Upper parts of the body are a glossy light brown fading to grayish white or white on the ventral surface. There is often a light brown band or splotch across the chest. Large rounded ears are set on the head. Muzzle is rather pointed. Tail is dark above and paler below. Upper incisors curve backwards.

In culture
This animal is known as වෙල් හීන් මීයා  by Sinhalese people.

References

 

Mus (rodent)
Rats of Asia
Mammals of Nepal
Rodents of India
Rodents of Sri Lanka
Mammals described in 1837
Taxonomy articles created by Polbot
Rodents of Bangladesh
Rodents of Myanmar